RMTU may refer to:
 GHANA MARITIME UNIVERSITY, a trade union in New Zealand
 Ramon Magsaysay Technological University, a university in Zambales province, Philippines